Aavathum Pennale Azhivathum Pennale is a 1996 Tamil-language crime film directed by Senthilnathan. The film stars C. Arunpandian, Mansoor Ali Khan and Jayabharathi. It was released on 17 May 1996.

Plot

The film begins with the murder of a reputed heart surgeon Dr. Charles (Vijay Krishnaraj (alias) R Krishnan). The next day, Sivalingam (Manivannan) is killed by a mysterious person. His wife, Chandra (Jayabharathi), is a corrupt and influential politician who supplies weapons to the terrorists. The mysterious person warns Chandra that he will continue to kill them. Antony (C. Arunpandian), an honest police officer, is charged to protect Chandra. Soon, Antony finds out that the killer was none other than Chandra's son-in-law and his best friend Prabhakaran (Mansoor Ali Khan).

In a flashback, Prabhakaran fell in love with and married Chandra's daughter Lakshmi (Rajashree). He lived happily with his mother (C. R. Vijayakumari), his wife Lakshmi and his son in Chandra's house. One day, his mother witnessed the murder of a CBI officer by Chandra, and Chandra poisoned her.

Antony and Prabhakaran decide to team up to punish the heartless Chandra.

Cast

C. Arunpandian as Antony
Mansoor Ali Khan as Prabhakaran
Jayabharathi as Chandra
M. N. Nambiar as Deena Dayalan
Manivannan as Sivalingam
Rajashree as Lakshmi
C. R. Vijayakumari as Prabhakaran's mother
T. N. S. Ashokakumar
Jinna
Bobby as Chandra's brother
Vivek as Dhanush
Balu Anand as Manush
Vijay Krishnaraj as Dr. Charles
Peeli Sivam as Police inspector
Raviraj as the Police inspector
Periyar Dasan as Amavasai, Prabhakaran's father
Chitti as CBI officer
Idichapuli Selvaraj as Astrologer
Kullamani as the Police inspector
Kovai Senthil as Kuppusamy
Vaithi as Azhagunambi
Nellai Siva as Sandana Karuppan
Kavithasri as Inspector Satyavadi
J. Lalitha as Lakshmi
Premi as Dr. Charles' wife
Sri Bharathi
LIC Narasimhan as Dr. Maari
Bayilvan Ranganathan
Silk Smitha in a special appearance

Soundtrack

The film score and the soundtrack were composed by Bala Bharathi. The soundtrack, released in 1996, features 6 tracks with lyrics written by Piraisoodan.

References

External links

1996 films
Indian crime action films
1990s Tamil-language films
Films directed by Senthilnathan
1990s crime action films